The Glaze Brook, or River Glaze, is a minor river in the River Mersey catchment area, England. From Hope Carr (just inside Leigh) to the River Mersey it forms the county boundary with Cheshire.

Pennington Brook starts at the outflow of Pennington Flash  close to Aspull Common. Pennington Flash is fed by Hey Brook, a continuation of Borsdane Brook, which runs southwards from Blackrod.

Glaze Brook originates at the confluence of Pennington Brook and Moss Brook, approximately 120 m north of Hawkhurst Bridge. After picking up the waters of Bedford Brook, which runs southward from Leigh and the Black or Moss Brook coming west from Worsley via Chat Moss, the brook turns southward, ultimately draining into the River Mersey section of the Manchester Ship Canal near Cadishead.

The Glaze Brook's catchment drains the flat lowland around Leigh which reaches a maximum altitude of 158 mAOD. The brook flows through largely agricultural land. Its tributaries extend into former mining and industrial areas in which mining subsidence has created flashes (lakes) at Pennington and Westleigh. The underlying geology is the sandstone and coal measures of the Lancashire Coalfield.

Tributaries
 Willow Brook
 Jibcroft Brook
 Carr Brook
 Black/Moss Brook
 Bedford Brook
 Lilford Park Brook
 Atherton Lake Brook
 Atherton Brook
 Collier Brook
 Hindsford Brook
 Shakerley Brook
 Old Mill Brook
 Cutacre Brook
 Chanters Brook
 Carr Brook
 Pen Leach Brook
 Town Brook
 Astley Brook
 Elennor Brook
 Honksford Brook
 Whitehead Brook
 Stirrup Brook
 Ellen Brook
 Shaw Brook
 Pennington Brook
 Hey Brook
 Westleigh Brook
 Small Brook
 Marsh Brook
 Cunningham Brook
 Pennington Brook 
 Hall Lee Brook
 Windy Bank Brook
 Nan Holes Brook
 Coffin Lane Brook
 Borsdane Brook
 Dog Pool Brook

References

Rivers of Cheshire
Rivers of Greater Manchester
1Glaze